Statistics of the Scottish Football League in season 1895–96.

Overview
Celtic topped the Scottish Division One.

Abercorn came first in the Scottish Division Two. Leith Athletic and Renton finished second and third

Scottish League Division One

Scottish League Division Two

See also
1895–96 in Scottish football

References

 
1895-96